Francis Gerald Agar-Robartes, 7th Viscount Clifden (14 April 1883 – 15 July 1966), was a British Liberal politician.

Clifden was the second but eldest surviving son (his elder brother Captain the Hon. Thomas Agar-Robartes having been killed in the First World War) of Thomas Agar-Robartes, 6th Viscount Clifden, and his wife Mary (née Dickenson), and was educated at Eton and Christ Church, Oxford. In 1930 he succeeded his father in the viscountcy and to Lanhydrock House and took his seat on the Liberal benches in the House of Lords.

From 1940 to 1945 he served as a Lord-in-waiting (government whip in the House of Lords) in Winston Churchill's coalition government.

In 1953 he donated the Lanhydrock House and approximately 160 hectares (400 acres) of parkland to the National Trust.

Death
Lord Clifden died in July 1966, aged 83. He never married and was succeeded in the viscountcy by his younger brother Arthur.

References
Kidd, Charles, Williamson, David (editors). Debrett's Peerage and Baronetage (1990 edition). New York: St Martin's Press, 1990.

Profile, thepeerage.com; Retrieved 3 April 2016.

1883 births
1966 deaths
Francis
Alumni of Christ Church, Oxford
Knights Commander of the Royal Victorian Order
Ministers in the Churchill wartime government, 1940–1945
People educated at Eton College
People from Lanhydrock
Viscounts in the Peerage of Ireland